Mário Costa Martins de Carvalho (born 25 September 1944, in Lisbon) is a Portuguese playwright and novelist.

Life
Mario de Carvalho was born in Lisbon, Portugal. He was involved in the resistance against Salazar’s dictatorship (a member of the Portuguese Communist Party), and had an adventurous youth. During his military service he was jailed and tortured (sleep deprived for 11 days), and eventually escaped to Sweden, fleeing the country on foot. After the democratic revolution in 1974 he returned to Portugal and practiced law for many years.

His first book of short stories, published in 1981, marked the beginning of a successful writing career. He has published numerous novels, story collections and plays and has been widely translated. 
His style is simultaneously versatile and crafted, and his fictions are set in various times and places.
A God Strolling in the Cool of the Evening («Um Deus Passeando Pela Brisa da Tarde») won the 1996  Pegasus Prize for Literature and has been translated into English, French, Spanish, Italian, German, Greek and Bulgarian. The novel, a historical timeless tale on human nature,  received excellent reviews, and is considered a classic in the genre.

He is the father of the Portuguese writer Ana Margarida de Carvalho

Works
 Contos da Sétima Esfera (Contos), 1981
 Casos do Beco das Sardinheiras (Contos), 1982
 O Livro Grande de Tebas, Navio e Mariana (Romance), 1982
 A inaudita guerra da Avenida Gago Coutinho (Contos), 1983
 Fabulário (Contos), 1984
 Contos Soltos (Contos), 1986
 A Paixão do Conde de Fróis (Romance), 1986
 E se Tivesse a Bondade de Me Dizer Porquê?(Folhetim), em colab. com Clara Pinto Correia, 1986
 Os Alferes (Contos), 1989
 Quatrocentos Mil Sestércios seguido de O Conde Jano (Novelas), 1991 - Grande Prémio de Conto Camilo Castelo Branco
 Água em pena de pato (Teatro), 1991
 Um Deus Passeando pela Brisa da Tarde (Romance), 1994 (A God Strolling in the Cool of the Evening, 1997) - 1996 Pegasus Prize
 Era Bom que Trocássemos Umas Ideias Sobre o Assunto (Romance), 1995
 Apuros de um Pessimista em Fuga (Novela), 1999
 Se Perguntarem por Mim, Não Estou seguido de Haja Harmonia (Teatro), 1999
 Contos Vagabundos (Contos), 2000
 Fantasia para dois coronéis e uma piscina (Romance), 2003
 O Homem que Engoliu a Lua (Infanto-juvenil), 2003
 A Sala Magenta 2008
 A Arte de Morrer Longe 2010
 O Homem do Turbante Verde (Contos), 2011
 Quando o Diabo Reza, 2011
 A Liberdade De Pátio, (contos) 2013

External links
Mario de Carvalho: Official Site

1944 births
Living people
Portuguese communists
Portuguese male dramatists and playwrights
Portuguese male novelists
People from Lisbon
20th-century Portuguese dramatists and playwrights
20th-century Portuguese novelists
20th-century Portuguese male writers
21st-century Portuguese dramatists and playwrights
21st-century Portuguese novelists
21st-century Portuguese male writers